Yifeng County is a county in the northwest of Jiangxi province, People's Republic of China. It is under the jurisdiction of the prefecture-level city of Yichun.

Administrative divisions
Yifeng County currently has 7 towns and 5 townships. 
7 towns

5 townships

Demographics 

Climate

Notes and references

External links
  Government site - 

County-level divisions of Jiangxi